Kim Yong-Han (born June 28, 1986) is a South Korean football player who is currently a free agent.

He played for Incheon United in the K-League.

In Incheon, Kim played 3 games in the 2006 Hauzen Cup.

References

1986 births
Living people
South Korean footballers
South Korean expatriate footballers
South Korean expatriate sportspeople in Indonesia
Expatriate footballers in Indonesia
K League 1 players
Korea National League players
Liga 1 (Indonesia) players
Incheon United FC players
Chungju Hummel FC players
Persiba Bantul players
Persiwa Wamena players
Association football forwards
Association football midfielders